"The Doctrine of Fascism" is an essay attributed to Benito Mussolini. In truth, the first part of the essay, entitled , was written by the Italian philosopher Giovanni Gentile, while only the second part  is the work of Mussolini himself.

Overview
The entire entry on fascism spans pages 847–884 of the Enciclopedia Italiana, and includes numerous photographs and graphic images. The entry starts on page 847 and ends on 851 with the credit line "Benito Mussolini." All subsequent translations of "The Doctrine of Fascism" are from this work.

A key concept of the Mussolini essay was that fascism was a rejection of previous models: "Granted that the nineteenth century was the century of socialism, liberalism, democracy, this does not mean that the twentieth century must also be the century of socialism, liberalism, democracy. Political doctrines pass; nations remain. We are free to believe that this is the century of authority, a century tending to the "right", a Fascist century. If the nineteenth century was the century of the individual (liberalism implies individualism) we are free to believe that this is the "collective" century, and therefore the century of the State."

In 1940, Mussolini ordered all remaining copies of the document, which had different editions and translations, to be retracted "because he changed his mind about certain points".

Translations
The first authorized translation into English was prepared by Jane Soames and published by Leonard and Virginia Woolf in 1933 (The Political and Social Doctrine of Fascism, London: Hogarth Press, 1933). Soames' translation was also published in The Living Age, November 1933, New York City, p. 241, as a chapter entitled "The Doctrine of Fascism".

Other translations include:
Nathanael Greene, ed., Fascism: An Anthology, New York: Thomas Y. Crowell, 1968, pp. 41, 43–44
 Benito Mussolini, My Autobiography: With "The Political and Social Doctrine of Fascism", Mineola, New York: Dover Publications, 2006, p. 236.

See also
 Constitution of Fiume
 Corporatism
 Definitions of fascism
 Fascism and ideology
 "Fascist Manifesto"
 Italian racial laws
 "Manifesto of Race"
 "Manifesto of the Fascist Intellectuals"
 Sansepolcrismo

Notes

References
Fascism, Noel O'Sullivan, 1983 pg 138: referencing; Mussolini's Roman Empire, by Mack Smith Penguin, ed., 1979, first published in 1976.
Mussolini, Benito (1935). The Doctrine of Fascism. Florence: Vallecchi Editore.
Mussolini, Benito (1935). Fascism: Doctrine and Institutions. Rome: Ardita Publishers.
Translation of the 1932 Enciclopedia Italiana essay "Doctrines" by Mussolini. This translation is by Mr. I. S. Munro, from "Fascism to World-Power" (Alexander Maclehose, London, 1933). It is part of a 1984 compilation book: Readings on Fascism and National Socialism; Swallow Press, Athens, Ohio, 1984. 
Schnapp, Jeffrey T.; Sears, Olivia E.; Stampino, Maria G. (2000). A Primer of Italian Fascism. University of Nebraska Press. 
My Autobiography. Book by Benito Mussolini; Charles Scribner's Sons, 1928.

External links
The Doctrine of Fascism by Benito Mussolini Complete text of the essay "Dottrina" (Doctrines). A translation of the Benito Mussolini "Doctrines" section of the "Fascism" entry in the 1932 edition of the Enciclopedia Italiana. From the publication Fascism: Doctrine and Institutions, by Benito Mussolini, 1935, 'Ardita' Publishers, Rome. Footnote numbers inserted in the text, and a footnote appendix (both not found in the 1932 encyclopedia article), are found in this 1935 publication. The footnotes contain excerpts from his speeches.
 Authorized translation of Mussolini's "The Political and Social Doctrine of Fascism" (1933)
Italian text.
What is Fascism? Quotes from Mussolini and Hitler. English. Includes a few excerpts from another translation into English of the Mussolini essay on "Doctrines" in the 1932 edition of the Enciclopedia Italiana. From The Doctrine of Fascism, by Benito Mussolini, 1935, Firenze: Vallecchi Editore.
2 Mussolini autobiographies in one book. English. Searchable. Click on the result titled "My Rise and Fall" (usually the top result). Then use the search form in the left column titled "search within this book."

1932 documents
1932 essays
1932 in Italy
1932 in politics
Italian fascist works
Philosophy books
Political books
Giovanni Gentile
Benito Mussolini